Ungdomskulen (youth school) is a band from Bergen, Norway. The band has changed name several times, such as Standing Ovation, Thundersome and Goddamnit.

Band members 
 Kristian Stockhaus – guitar, vocal
 Frode Kvinge Flatland – bass/baritone guitar
 Øyvind Solheim – percussion

Discography 
 Gold Rush (2018)
 Secrecy (2012)
 Gimme Ten (EP, 2011)
 Bisexual (2009)
 Cry Baby (2007)
 Ordinary Son (7" picture disc) (2007)
 OH LIFE! / ORDINARY SON (7") (2007)
 Foursome And Then Some (7") (2004)
 What It Takes (7") (2004)
 Surf's Up (7") (2004)

United States tour locations 2007 
 Oct 20 2007 – CMJ Music Festival at Cake Shop New York City, New York
 Oct 22 2007 – Garfield Artworks in Pittsburgh, Pennsylvania
 Oct 23 2007 – The Talking Head Club in Baltimore
 Oct 23 2007 – Bearcast Radio, University of Cincinnati, in Ohio
 Oct 24 2007 – Ear-X-Tacy Records, in-store concert in Louisville, Kentucky
 Oct 24 2007 – Pour Haus (feat. The Photographic) in Louisville

Bisexual
Ungdomskulen released their album, Bisexual on March 2, 2009.

Track listing
Sleep Over Beethoven
The Observer
Idunno
Osaka
Only In Novels
Teenage Tritonus
Lose Control
A. Golden Egg/B. Disposable Hunk/C. Pink and Blue Checkered Toenails.

References

External links 
 Official homepage
 Pitchfork review

Norwegian musical groups